This is the list of films produced and/or televised under the Sci Fi Pictures label of the cable television channel Sci Fi Channel and then later when it was renamed Syfy.

List of films

2010: Moby Dick
2012: Doomsday
2012: Supernova
2025: Armageddon
100 Degrees Below Zero
100 Feet
100 Million BC
2-Headed Shark Attack
3-Headed Shark Attack
5-Headed Shark Attack
6-Headed Shark Attack
2 Lava 2 Lantula!
40 Days and Nights
51
500 MPH Storm
30,000 Leagues Under the Sea
AE: Apocalypse Earth
A.I. Assault
Abominable
Age of Dinosaurs
Age of Ice
Age of the Dragons
Age of Tomorrow
Air Collision
Airline Disaster
Airplane vs. Volcano
Alien Apocalypse
Alien Convergence
Alien Express
Alien Hunter
Alien Lockdown
Alien Predator
Alien Siege
Alien Tornado
Almighty Thor
American Warships
Anaconda 3: Offspring
Anacondas: Trail of Blood
Android Apocalypse
Annihilation Earth
Anonymous Rex
Antibody
Apocalypse Pompeii
Arachnoquake
Arctic Apocalypse
Arctic Predator
Asteroid vs. Earth
Atlantic Rim
Atlantic Rim: Resurrection
Atomic Shark
Attack of the Sabretooth
Avalanche Sharks
Avengers Grimm
Avengers Grimm: Time Wars
AVH: Alien vs. Hunter
Axe Giant: The Wrath of Paul Bunyan
Aztec Rex
Ba'al: The Storm God
Babylon 5: The Legend of the Rangers
Basilisk: The Serpent King
Bats: Human Harvest
Battledogs
Battle Planet
Battle of Los Angeles
Beauty and the Beast
Behemoth
Bering Sea Beast
Bermuda Tentacles
Beyond Loch Ness
Beyond Re-Animator
Big Ass Spider!
Bigfoot
Black Forest
Black Hole
Black Swarm
Blast Vegas
Blood Lake: Attack of the Killer Lampreys
Blood Monkey
Bloodsuckers
Boa vs. Python
Bone Eater
Boogeyman
Bugs
Carny
Caved In: Prehistoric Terror
Cerberus
Camel Spiders
Children of the Corn (2009)
 Christmas Icetastrophe
Chupacabra vs. The Alamo
Chupacabra: Dark Seas
Cobragator
Collision Earth
Control Factor
Copperhead
Croc
Cucuy: The Boogeyman
Curse of the Komodo
Cry of the Winged Serpent
Crystal Skulls
Cube 2: Hypercube
Cyclops
Dam Shark
Darklight
Dark Haul
Dark Relic
Day of Reckoning
Dead 7
Dead and Deader
Dead in the Water
Deadly Descent: The Abominable Snowman
Deathlands: Homeward Bound
Decoys
Deep Shock
Descent
Dinocroc
Dinocroc vs. Supergator
Dinoshark
Disaster Zone: Volcano in New York
Doomsday Prophecy
Dog Soldiers
Dracano
Dragon Dynasty
Dragon Fighter
Dragon Storm
Dragon Wasps
Dungeons & Dragons: Wrath of the Dragon God
Earth's Final Hours
End of the World
Empire of the Sharks
Encrypt
Epoch
Epoch: Evolution
Eye of the Beast
Ferocious Planet
Finders Keepers
Fire & Ice
Fire Serpent
Firestarter: Rekindled
Fire Twister
Flu Bird Horror
Flying Monkeys
Frankenfish
Frenzy
Gargoyle: Wings of Darkness
Geo-Disaster
Ghosthunters
Ghostquake
Ghost Shark
Ghost Storm
Ghost Town
Ghost Voyage
Goblin
Grave Halloween
Grendel
Grizzly Rage
Gryphon
Hammerhead: Shark Frenzy
Hansel & Gretel
Hansel vs. Gretel
Harpies
Headless Horseman
Heatstroke
Heebie Jeebies
Hellhounds
Highlander: The Source
High Plains Invaders
Hornet
House of Bones
House of the Dead 2
House of the Witch
Hybrid
Hydra
I Am Omega
Ice Quake
Ice Road Terror
Ice Sharks
Ice Spiders
Ice Twisters
In the Spider's Web
Independence Daysaster
Independents' Day
Infected
Infestation
Invasion Roswell
IF2: Interceptor Force 2
Iron Invader
Jabberwock
Jersey Shore Shark Attack
Journey to the Center of the Earth
 Jules Verne's Mysterious Island
Jurassic Attack
Karma
KAW
Killer High
Killer Mountain
Komodo vs. Cobra
Kraken: Tentacles of the Deep
Lake Placid 2
Lake Placid 3
Lake Placid: Legacy
Lake Placid: The Final Chapter
Lake Placid vs. Anaconda
Larva
Lavalantula
Leprechaun Returns
Lightspeed
Living Hell
Locusts: The 8th Plague
Lost City Raiders
Lost Voyage
Magma: Volcanic Disaster
Malibu Shark Attack
Mammoth
Mandrake
Man with the Screaming Brain
Man-Thing
Mansquito
Manticore
Maneater
Martian Land
Megafault
Megalodon
Mega Piranha
Mega Python vs. Gatoroid
Mega Shark vs. Giant Octopus
Mega Shark vs. Crocosaurus
Mega Shark vs. Mecha Shark
Mega Shark vs. Kolossus
Mega Snake
Merlin and the Book of Beasts
Metal Tornado 
Meteor Apocalypse
Meteor Storm
Mindstorm
Minotaur
Mississippi River Sharks
Momentum
Mongolian Death Worm
Monster
Monster Ark
Monster Island
Monsterwolf
Mothman
Nature Unleashed: Avalanche
Nature Unleashed: Earthquake
Nature Unleashed: Fire
Nature Unleashed: Tornado
Nature Unleashed: Volcano
Nazis at the Center of the Earth
New Alcatraz
Neverknock
Nightmare Shark
Night of the Wild
No Escape Room
NYC: Tornado Terror
Oceans Rising
Odysseus: Voyage to the Underworld
Ogre
Ominous
Ozark Sharks
P-51 Dragon Fighter
Painkiller Jane
Path of Destruction
Pegasus vs. Chimera
Piranhaconda
Planet Of The Sharks
Planet Raptor
Polar Storm
Post Impact
Project Viper
Pterodactyl
Pumpkinhead: Ashes to Ashes
Pumpkinhead: Blood Feud
Puppet Master vs. Demonic Toys 
Python
Pythons 2
Rage of the Yeti
Ragin Cajun Redneck Gators
Raptor Island
Raptor Ranch
Razortooth
Red Clover
Red Faction: Origins (2011)
Red: Werewolf Hunter
Reign of the Gargoyles
Reptisaurus
Return of the Living Dead: Necropolis
Return of the Living Dead: Rave to the Grave
Riddles of the Sphinx
Rise of the Gargoyles
Rise of the Zombies
Riverworld
Roadkill
Rock Monster
Robin Hood: Beyond Sherwood Forest
Robocroc
Roboshark
S.S. Doomtrooper
Sabretooth
 Saint Sinner
San Andreas Mega Quake
San Andreas Quake
Sand Serpents
Sand Sharks
Sands of Oblivion
Santa Jaws
Sasquatch Mountain
Savage Planet
Scarecrow
Scream of the Banshee
Sea Beast
Seattle Superstorm
Seeds of Destruction
Shadows of the Dead
Shark in Venice
Shark Season
Shark Swarm
Shark Week
Sharknado
Sharknado 2: The Second One 
Sharknado 3: Oh Hell No!
Sharknado: The 4th Awakens
Sharknado 5: Global Swarming
The Last Sharknado: It's About Time
Sharktopus
Sharktopus vs. Pteracuda
Sharktopus vs. Whalewolf
Showdown at Area 51
Silent Venom
Silent Warnings
Sinbad and the Minotaur
Sinister Squad
Skeleton Man
Slayer
Slipstream
Slumber Party Massacre
Snakeman
Snakehead Swamp
Snakehead Terror
Snow Beast
Snowmageddon
Something Beneath
Soulkeeper
Space Twister
Species III
Species: The Awakening
 Splinter
Star Runners
Stir of Echoes: The Homecoming
Stonados
Stonehenge Apocalypse
Supercroc
Super Cyclone
Super Eruption
Supergator
Super Shark
Swamp Devil
Swamp Shark
Swamp Volcano
Swarmed
Tasmanian Devils
Terminal Invasion
Terror Birds
Terrordactyl
The 12 Disasters of Christmas
The Crooked Man
The Eden Formula
The Fallen Ones
The Ghouls
The Hive
The Hollow
The Immortal Voyage of Captain Drake
The Land That Time Forgot
The Lost Future
The Lost Treasure of the Grand Canyon
The Night Before Halloween
The Philadelphia Experiment
The Sandman
They Found Hell
Three Inches
Threshold
Time Machine: Rise of the Morlocks
Titanic II
Tomb Invader
Toxic Shark
Trailer Park Shark
Triassic Attack
Triassic World
Truth or Dare
Vipers
Warbirds
War Wolves
Webs: The Movie
Witchslayer Gretl
Witchville
Wolvesbayne
Wraiths of Roanoke
Wyvern
Xtinction: Predator X
Yeti
Zodiac: Signs of the Apocalypse
Zombie Apocalypse
Zombie Night
Zombie Shark
Zombie Tidal Wave
Zoombies
Zoombies 2

See also
Syfy announced, unrealized projects

References

External links

Syfy original films